The Shaughnessy Cohen Prize for Political Writing is a Canadian literary award, presented by the Writers' Trust of Canada to the best nonfiction book on Canadian political and social issues. It has been presented annually in Ottawa at the Writers’ Trust Politics and the Pen gala since 2000, superseding the organization's defunct Gordon Montador Award. 

The award had a dollar value in 2015 of CAD25,000.

The prize was established in honour of Shaughnessy Cohen (February 11, 1948 - December 9, 1998), an outspoken and popular Liberal Member of Parliament from Windsor, Ontario who died after suffering a cerebral hemorrhage in the House of Commons of Canada just seconds after standing to address her peers. The award is sponsored by CN.

Submissions
All Canadian-based publishers of original manuscripts may enter two books; companies publishing more than ten eligible nonfiction titles during the 2012 calendar year may add one book for every additional ten eligible books (or fraction thereof) on their nonfiction list, up to a maximum of five. For example, a publisher with a list of 18 qualifying nonfiction books would be entitled to submit three — two for the first ten and one for the next ten.

Jury
A three-person jury selects the winner and finalists of the Shaughnessy Cohen Prize for Political Writing. The jury acts independently of the Writers’ Trust and is charged with interpreting the mandate and eligibility criteria of the prize, as well as determining which of the submissions best reflect the prize mandate. In evaluating the writing, literary merit is the sole criteria. Each juror may request an unlimited number of additional titles from the publisher's lists. Such titles are on equal footing with all other submissions, provided that their publishers agree to abide by the conditions laid out in this document. The judgment of the jury in selecting the winners, determining eligibility, and interpreting these rules is final.

Winners and nominees

References

External links
 Shaughnessy Cohen Prize

Writers' Trust of Canada awards
Political book awards
Awards established in 2000
2000 establishments in Ontario
Books about politics of Canada
Canadian non-fiction literary awards